Ajuga piskoi is a herbaceous flowering plant native to Greece, North Macedonia and Albania. It was first described in 1896.

Description

This species is found in sunny locations within deciduous forest and shrubland, usually in grassy clearings or roadsides. It grows yellow/white flowers with purple veins in June/July. It is considered vulnerable due to deforestation.

References

piskoi
Flora of Southeastern Europe
Groundcovers